Brandon Dean Wakeling (born 2 February 1994) is an Australian weightlifter. He won the gold medal in the men's 73 kg event at the 2019 Pacific Games held in Apia, Samoa. He represented Australia at the 2020 Summer Olympics in Tokyo, Japan. He also represented Australia at the Commonwealth Games in 2018 and 2022.

Career 

In 2017, Wakeling won the silver medal in the men's 69kg event at the Oceania Weightlifting Championships held in Gold Coast, Australia. In the same month, he also competed in the men's 69kg event at the 2017 Asian Indoor and Martial Arts Games held in Ashgabat, Turkmenistan. He finished in 8th place.

He represented Australia at the 2018 Commonwealth Games held in Gold Coast, Queensland, Australia and he competed in the men's 69kg event. He finished in 7th place. At the 2018 World Weightlifting Championships held in Ashgabat, Turkmenistan, he competed in the men's 73kg event without winning a medal. He finished in 36th place.

In 2019, he won the bronze medal in the men's 73kg event at the Arafura Games. In the same year, he also represented Australia at the 2019 Pacific Games and he won the gold medal in the men's 73kg event. At this event, he set a new Oceania Clean & Jerk record with a lift of 167kg. In the men's 73kg event at the 2019 World Weightlifting Championships he finished in 31st place. In 2019, he also competed in the men's 73kg event at the 6th International Qatar Cup held in Doha, Qatar where he finished in 9th place.

Wakeling represented Australia at the 2020 Summer Olympics in Tokyo, Japan. He competed in the men's 73 kg event. He finished outside the top ten. He competed in the men's 73 kg event at the 2022 Commonwealth Games held in Birmingham, England.

Personal life 

He studied marketing at Griffith University.

References

External links 
 

Living people
1994 births
Place of birth missing (living people)
Australian male weightlifters
Commonwealth Games competitors for Australia
Weightlifters at the 2018 Commonwealth Games
Weightlifters at the 2022 Commonwealth Games
Griffith University alumni
Weightlifters at the 2020 Summer Olympics
Olympic weightlifters of Australia
21st-century Australian people